Paolo Lorenzi was the defending champion but decided not to participate.
Carlos Salamanca won the title, defeating Rubén Ramírez Hidalgo 5–7, 6–2, 6–1 in the final.

Seeds

Draw

Finals

Top half

Bottom half

References
 Main Draw
 Qualifying Draw

Seguros Bolivar Open Pereira - Singles
2012 Singles